The Fiji national rugby league team, nicknamed the Bati (pronounced ), has been participating in international rugby league football since 1992. The team is controlled by the governing body for rugby league in Fiji, Fiji National Rugby League (FNRL), which is currently a member of the Asia-Pacific Rugby League Confederation (APRLC). Fiji have thrice reached the semi-finals of the Rugby League World Cup, in 2008, 2013 and 2017, and are currently ranked 6th in the International Rugby League's World Rankings. They are coached by Fijian Joe Dakuitoga, who was appointed in August 2020, and their captain is Kevin Naiqama.

History

1990s
The game was introduced to Fiji only in 1992 but despite this there has been a long history of Fijian players making their mark in rugby league, most notably back in the 1960s when great players such as Joe Levula and Laitia Ravouvou joined Rochdale Hornets and became household names in the English competition.

Interest and participation in rugby league snowballed throughout Fiji, and as well as continued success in the Rugby League World Sevens, the Batis began playing full 13-aside games against international teams. By 1994, Fiji had hammered the Great Britain amateurs 40–8 and, captained by mighty front-rower James Pickering, beat  20–12.

They had also produced their first rugby league superstar after winger Noa Nadruku joined Canberra Raiders and in 1993 became the top try-scorer in the Australian competition.

Fiji took part in their first World Cup in 1995 where, just as the 2000 World Cup, they had the misfortune to be placed in the same group as both England and Australia. But the Batis made a massive impression in their opening World Cup game in which they ran riot against South Africa, 52–6, and had the crowd on their feet at Keighley.

During the Super League war, Fiji, like most countries other countries, aligned itself with Super League. In search of international competition, the Australian Rugby League played a match against a "National Rugby League of Fiji" team in 1996. This match has been granted Test status by the ARL, but not by the Rugby League International Federation.

2000s
Coached by Don Furner, Sr. and captained by Lote Tuqiri, Fiji competed in the 2000 World Cup but did not progress past the tournament's group stage.

The Fiji Bati qualified for the 2008 Rugby League World Cup held in Australia after finishing second in Pacific qualifying behind . Fiji's qualification campaign started with a thrilling 30–28 loss to Samoa before reversing the scoreline a few days later with a 30–28 win over the Tongans. Fiji won their final qualifying game against Cook Islands 40–4. Having qualified the Vodafone Fiji Bati team started their Rugby League World Cup 2008 campaign with 42–6 win over France followed by a 2-point defeat to Scotland, however they topped their group with a superior points difference. Beating Ireland in their quarter final they came within one match of the World Cup final, but were defeated by Australia, ending the tournament in 4th place.

2010s
Fiji automatically qualified for the 2013 Rugby League World Cup after participating in the 2008 tournament. They took on 
Australia, England and Ireland in the pool stage. In their first match they took on 'the Wolfhounds'. They played at the famous Spotland Stadium, in Rochdale, where Fiji have an historic affiliation with. The Fijians convincingly won by a score of 32–14. As expected Fiji lost to both Australia and England, although they surprised many, as they only conceded 34 points against the teams in each game and they led 2–0 against Australia, and were within a few minutes of taking a half-time lead against England. Fiji would take on 'fierce Pacific rivals' Samoa in the quarter final. They won the, passionate pacific, fixture and they would celebrate with a 22–4 victory. They celebrated even more, as it meant Fiji reached their second consecutive World Cup semi-final. They took on Australia again, but this game was nothing like the group stage fixture. Fiji's errors conceded them 62 points against a classy Australian side. This defeat ended and equalled their best World Cup campaign in their history.

In May 2014, Fiji took on Samoa in the 2014 Pacific Rugby League Test at Penrith Stadium. The International was created as a qualifier for the final 2014 Four Nations spot. It was also a chance for the Four Nations team (winner of this international) to warm-up before the event kicked off later in the year. Fiji failed to qualify with their fierce pacific rivals getting the better of them by 32–16.

In May 2015, Fiji took on Papua New Guinea in the 2015 Melanesian Cup test at Cbus Super Stadium. Fiji won the match and the inaugural Melanesian Cup title. Fiji never looked like losing the match after an easy first half performance, leading 18-0 at the break. They went on to win the test match by 22–10.

In May 2016, Fiji took on Papua New Guinea in the 2016 Melanesian Cup test at Pirtek Stadium. Fiji had a similar situation in this year's Melanesian Cup with a half-time score of 16–8 but this time around they conceded too many second half points allowing the Kumuls to make a shock comeback and win the match 24–22.

In the 2017 Rugby League World Cup in New Zealand & Australia, Fiji topped Group D before recording their biggest upset victory, defeating New Zealand 4–2 in the quarter finals. They then lost to Australia 54–6 in the semi finals.

2020s
Fiji automatically qualified for the 2021 Rugby League World Cup having reached the semi finals of the previous Rugby League World Cup. The 2021 tournament will take place in England.

Kit

Players

Current squad
20 man squad selected for the match against  Papua New Guinea in the 2022 Pacific Test. 
Statistics for Fiji and the players' NRL club records (up to 21 June 2022) drawn from the Rugby League Project. 

 Age is as at the match date, 25 June 2022.
 Players listed in order of jumper number for the 25 June 2022 match, as given in the [https://www.nrl.com/draw/internationals/2022/round-1/papua-new-guinea-v-fiji/ team list on the NRL website.

Tournament history and world ranking

Rugby League World Cup

Four Nations

Pacific Cup

Other competitions
Fiji have also participated in:

World Sevens (1992–2003)
Super League World Nines (1996,1997)
Superleague Oceania Tournament (1997)
Pacific Rim Competition (2004)

International Results

The table below shows Fiji's all-time international rugby league record as of 18 December 2020. They have been participating in International fixtures since 1992.

Recent Results
Below are the previous 5 matches of the national team.

See also

Fiji National Rugby League Competition
Fiji women's national rugby league team
Fiji National Rugby League
Rugby league in Fiji

References

External links
 Google-Video
 Fiji Rugby League Fans Forums - RugbyLeague.org
 2008 Rugby League World Cup Site

 
National rugby league teams
Pacific Rugby League International
Rugby league in Fiji